Zonnestraal may refer to:
Zonnestraal (estate), a 1925 estate and former sanatorium in Hilversum, Netherlands
Ray of Sunshine, a 1919 Dutch silent film directed by Theo Frenkel